Pogonocherus pilosipes is a species of beetle in the family Cerambycidae. It was described by Maurice Pic in 1907. It is known from China.

References

Pogonocherini
Beetles described in 1907